Merrideth Jeran Akers  (born c. 1947) was the mayor of Plano, Texas from 2000–2002, and ran for the Republican nomination for Collin County Commissioner in 2006.

Early life and career
Akers was born in Cordova, Alabama. Akers graduated from the University of Alabama in 1969 with a Bachelor of Science in Marketing.  While a student at Alabama, Akers was a member of the Air Force ROTC and the Lambda Chi Alpha fraternity, as well as the Arnold Air Society.  He served in the United States Air Force from 1969 to 1973, earning the rank of captain. While in the Air Force, Akers received a Master of Arts in Public Administration. After the Air Force, Akers moved to Texas in 1975 and lived in Plano, Texas since 1985.

Political career
Akers served on the Plano City Council from 1993-1999, including as Deputy Mayor Pro Tem from 1997–1998 and Mayor Pro Tem from 1998-1999. 

Akers was elected mayor on May 6, 2000, with 64.17% of the vote, defeating opponent Dick Bode. While Mayor of Plano, Akers founded the Collin County Mayors’ Alliance and was a member of the Metroplex Mayor’s Alliance.

Akers served one term as mayor before being defeated by Pat Evans in 2002.

Post-mayor life
In 2006, Akers lost election the Republican Primary for County Commissioner to Jack Hatchell. 
From 2010 to 2013, Akers was the President and CEO of the Celina Chamber of Commerce.

References 

Living people
Mayors of Plano, Texas
University of Alabama alumni
1940s births
Place of birth missing (living people)
Texas Republicans
People from Cordova, Alabama